The broad-tailed paradise whydah (Vidua obtusa) is a species of bird in the family Viduidae. It is found woodland and acacia savanna habitat in Sub-Saharan Africa from Angola to Uganda, Tanzania and Mozambique. A brood parasite, it has a wide range and the International Union for Conservation of Nature has assessed it as being of least concern.

Taxonomy
Chapin described the broad-tailed paradise whydah as Steganura aucupum obtusa from Luchenza in 1922. Previously, Vidua obtusa, V. interjecta, V. orientalis, V. paradisaea and V. togoensis were considered to be in the same species, and these five species are sometimes placed in the genus Steganura. The broad-tailed paradise whydah is a monotypic species.

Description
The breeding male has long tail feathers with rounded tips. It has a chestnut-orange patch on its nape. The nonbreeding male's underparts are buffy, and its upperparts are grey-brown, with streaks. There are black and white stripes on its head. The female is similar to the nonbreeding male. The immature bird resembles the female, but some of its feathers have buffy edges, and its patterns are less distinct.

Distribution and habitat
Approximately half of the range overlaps with the range of the long-tailed paradise whydah. The broad-tailed paradise whydah's habitat is woodlands, including miombo and Baikiaea plurijuga woodland, and also acacia savannas.

Behaviour and ecology
The broad-tailed paradise whydah is a brood parasite, its host being the orange-winged pytilia (Pytilia afra). The host species only weighs  and is thus at a disadvantage. It mimics the host species's call. It feeds on the ground in small flocks, eating seeds. When the broad-tailed paradise whydah is not breeding, it may mix with the long-tailed paradise whydah. Breeding plumage has been observed from February to July in the southeastern Congo Basin. Newborn chicks have loose greyish down, very similar to chicks of the orange-winged pytilia. The incubation period and nestling period are unknown. Irruptions can occur; in 1994, an "invasion" of thousands of whydahs was reported in Kasane, Botswana.

Status
The species has a large range and a stable population trend, so the IUCN Red List has assessed the species as least concern.

References

External links
 The Paradise Whydahs Species Factsheet

broad-tailed paradise whydah
Birds of Southern Africa
broad-tailed paradise whydah
broad-tailed paradise whydah
Taxonomy articles created by Polbot